Meliosma littlei is a species of plant in the Sabiaceae family. It is endemic to Ecuador.

References

Flora of Ecuador
littlei
Endangered plants
Taxonomy articles created by Polbot